Elektroprivreda BiH or JP Elektroprivreda Bosne i Hercegovine d.d. (abbr. EPBiH) is a Bosnian public electric utility company with headquarters in Sarajevo, Bosnia and Herzegovina.

History
Elektroprivreda BiH was established on 30 August 1945 as the Electric Utility Company of Bosnia and Herzegovina "Elektrobih". On 20 May 2004, it became an entity government-owned publicly traded company. The company celebrates 7 September as the day of its establishment.

Structure
The company is the largest electric utility company in Bosnia and Herzegovina, and as such part of the largest country's energy concern EPBiH Concern. Elektroprivreda BiH is a joint stock company in which 90% of the capital is owned by the Federation of BiH entity government, and 10% is owned by minority shareholders.

Operations
Electric utility activities for the company are:
 generation and distribution of electricity,
 supply of electricity,
 trading, representation and mediation on the local electricity market,
 export and import of electricity, including the management of electricity system.

As the largest electric utility company in Bosnia and Herzegovina, it has 756,599 customers and 4,434 employees. As of 2017, the company has an installed generating capacities of 1,682 MW, of which in lignite-fired thermal power plants 1,165 MW, and hydro power plants 517 MW.

Also, it generates 7.009 TWh of electricity annually.

Electricity distribution is organized through five distribution regional offices:
 Elektrodistribucija Sarajevo,
 Elektrodistribucija Tuzla,
 Elektrodistribucija Zenica,
 Elektrodistribucija Bihać,
 Elektrodistribucija Mostar.

See also
 List of companies of Bosnia and Herzegovina
 Elektroprivreda HZ HB
 Elektroprivreda Republike Srpske

References

External links
 

Electric power companies of Bosnia and Herzegovina
Energy companies established in 1945
Companies based in Sarajevo
1945 establishments in Yugoslavia
Government-owned companies of Bosnia and Herzegovina
Government-owned energy companies